AL 333, commonly referred to as the "First Family", is a collection of prehistoric hominid teeth and bones. Discovered in 1975 by Donald Johanson's team in Hadar, Ethiopia, the "First Family" is estimated to be about 3.2 million years old, and consists of the remains of at least thirteen individuals of different ages. They are generally thought to be members of the species Australopithecus afarensis. There are multiple theories about the hominids' cause of death and some debate over their species and sexual dimorphism.

Discovery

In the late 1960s, the French paleoanthropologist Maurice Taieb started geological exploration of the relatively unexplored area of Ethiopia known as the Afar Triangle, located in the north of the country. Also known as the Danakil depression or Afar depression, this triangle is the lowest point in Ethiopia and one of the lowest in Africa. In 1972, Taieb invited Yves Coppens, a French paleontologist, Jon Kalb, an American geologist, and Donald Johanson, an American anthropologist, to survey the region in order to appraise the area's field exploration potential. They soon settled on working in the Hadar Formation, a sedimentary geological formation within the region. The four men established the International Afar Research Expedition (IARE), with Johanson in charge of the paleoanthropology aspect of the expedition.

Historically, the Afar Triangle had been unexplored because it was remote and inhospitable. However, the IARE chose to explore the region for other reasons. The geological sequence of the Hadar Formation consists of nearly 200 meters of strata, or rock layers, which span a significant geological time. The sediment was also fossil-rich and often preserved partial skeletons of animals, implying that the researchers could potentially recover well-preserved and more complete fossils from the environment. Furthermore, the area had feldspars and volcanic glass that would be valuable for chronometric dating.

From 1973 to 1977, the IARE campaigns resulted in the discovery of about 250 hominid fossils. The most famous of the Hadar discoveries is Lucy, the most complete A. afarensis skeleton that has been discovered. However, in 1975, this same formation also witnessed the discovery of numerous remains from another site, AL 333. These remains became known as the "First Family," and represent at least thirteen different individuals, both adults and children. The recovery of these 216 hominid specimens is unique in African paleoanthropology, since the close proximity of the different fossils suggests that these were individuals who might have lived in a group or been part of the same family.

Characteristics of findings
Of the 216 specimens, 197 were surface finds, and 19 were found within 80 cm in the ground, suggesting a common time of death. Further visits to AL 333 resulted in the discovery of 23 additional postcranial and 3 mandibular and dental specimens. This increased the estimate from 13 to at least 17 individuals (9 adults, 3 adolescents, and 5 young children). The fossils lacked extensive weathering.

In 2000, a complete fossil of the fourth metatarsal was recovered from AL 333. The morphology of this bone suggests that A. afarensis had transverse and longitudinal foot arches and therefore also had a very human-like bipedal gait.

Dating
The discovery of all of the fossils at AL 333 aligned close together in one geological stratum is an obvious sign that they died at about the same time. But absolute dating had to be used to ascertain that time. Because the specimens were found between two layers of volcanic ash, potassium-argon dating was used. Potassium-argon dating measures the ratio of radioactive potassium and the argon it decays into. It is ideal for dating volcanic material. In the case of AL 333, this method yielded an age of 3.18-3.21 million years.

Debate

Cause of death
The unique grouping of such a large number of individuals in the same place and at virtually the same time has led to much speculation over the cause of death. One popular theory was a flash flood, but more detailed study of the geological formation of the site has largely discredited this idea. An alternative theory is predation by large cats. This is partially supported by the absence of particular bone types and what may be damage to the fossils from a carnivore. However, damage to the fossils from predation is disputed. If a predator did kill the hominids, it would also mean that the bodies were likely accumulated at the site and not all killed at once. An additional theory suggested was food poisoning, but Johanson doubts this because of the hominids' vegetarian diet.

Species
Many doubts among the archaeological community have been expressed about whether or not the fossils of the "First Family" belong to a single species. The fact that the fossils consist of thirteen individuals all dating to the same time suggests that they are the same species. However, some believe that this is simply coincidence.

In an effort to solve this debate, archaeologists have extensively studied the size of the bones. The sizes of the largest bones found such as humeri and femora were compared. Although they measured different bones, all of the measurements could be used to estimate the size of the femoral head. Then, these measurements were compared to the femoral head of Lucy. The researchers believe that, like Lucy, the fossils probably belong to the species Australopithecus afarensis.

Sexual dimorphism
Once the individuals of the "First Family" were determined to be the same species, they became very useful to study the biological phenomenon of sexual dimorphism. The fossils of the 13-17 individuals are mostly jaws and teeth, but the few humeri and femora could be used to differentiate males and females. Early testing displayed results that strayed far from previous beliefs. The test results showed that A. afarensis had similar dimorphism to modern humans. During these early tests, it was assumed that the fossils represented a variety of males and females. However, some paleoanthropologists disagree with this, believing that although the size of the bones vary at AL 333, the variation is due to age and not the sex of the individuals. In order to give more insight about the sexual dimorphism of A. afarensis, the fossil bones from AL 333 were compared to other sites that contained remains of females. These tests show a level of sexual dimorphism comparable to gorillas, meaning that males were significantly larger than females.

References

Australopithecus fossils
Prehistoric Ethiopia
Neogene fossil record